The Cape Cod Gemini is an American sailing dinghy that was designed by A. Sidney DeWolf Herreshoff as a day sailer and first built in 1955.

Production
The design was initially built by the Herreshoff Manufacturing Company and later by Cape Cod Shipbuilding in the United States. A total of 150 boats have been completed since 1955, but it is now out of production. The manufacturer indicates that the molds are still available and that production could be re-started with a fleet order.

Design
The Cape Cod Gemini is a planing sailboat, initially built of wood and later constructed of fiberglass, with wood trim. It has a fractional sloop rig, a plumb stem, an angled transom, a transom-hung rudder controlled by a tiller and twin retractable leeboards. It displaces .

The design is normally sailed with a crew of two sailors, but can accommodate up to five adults.

See also
List of sailing boat types

References

External links
Official website

Dinghies
1950s sailboat type designs
Sailing yachts
Sailboat type designs by A. Sidney DeWolf Herreshoff
Sailboat types built by Cape Cod Shipbuilding